BoJack F. Horseman (born January 2, 1964) is a fictional character and the titular protagonist of the Netflix animated television series BoJack Horseman (20142020). He is voiced by Will Arnett and was created by Raphael Bob-Waksberg.  Prior to the series start, BoJack had starred in a hit 1990s sitcom called Horsin' Around. After that show ending, BoJack struggled to find acting work, instead living off residuals from Horsin' Arounds syndication.

BoJack, a self-loathing and alcoholic anthropomorphic narcissistic horse, suffers from depression and often engages in self-destructive behavior. He frequently drinks and takes drugs to excess and has difficulty maintaining positive relationships with others.

Fictional biography 
BoJack Horseman was born in San Francisco, California, on January 2, 1964. His acting career peaked when he starred in a successful family sitcom called Horsin' Around in the 1990s and later The BoJack Horseman Show, an edgier, unsuccessful sitcom which was cancelled in 2007 after just one season. Though he began as a young bright-eyed actor, he has since grown bitter, deeply depressed, and jaded towards Hollywood and whom he has become post-fame. BoJack has been shown to be caring and insightful, but his insecurities, loneliness, and desperate need for approval often result in self-destructive actions that devastate those around him. Many of his issues stem from drug abuse, alcohol abuse, horrible decisions he's made throughout his career, and issues with his unhappy parents during childhood, which the audience is shown through flashbacks. During the series, BoJack makes a comeback attempt, trying to act once again.

Seasons 1–2
In season 1, he receives an advance to write a memoir, but after difficulties starting, his publisher hires Diane Nguyen as his ghostwriter. Despite difficulty during the writing process, the book receives positive reviews, and brings BoJack back into the spotlight. At one point, BoJack attempts to apologize to his old friend, Herb Kazzaz, with whom he originally created Horsin' Around. BoJack feels guilt over the fact that he did not defend Herb after Herb was fired in the 90s after being outed as gay. But, because BoJack took such a long time to make an effort, Herb rejects his apology. This event deeply affects BoJack for the remaining seasons.

In season 2, he lands the role of Secretariat in a biopic of the famous horse. However, he struggles with the role and with the production in jeopardy, he inadvertently causes Secretariats director, Kelsey Jannings, to be fired. Overwhelmed, he escapes his troubles to New Mexico where he reconnects with his old friend Charlotte, who now has a husband, Kyle, and two kids, Penny and Trip. Unwilling to return to LA, he stays with Charlotte's family and becomes very close to them, especially Penny, and accompanies her and her friends Maddy and Pete to her prom where he gets them all drunk. As a result, Maddy gets alcohol poisoning, and BoJack threatens Pete into staying silent out of fear that the event could negatively impact BoJack's career. Later, Penny makes a pass at BoJack and he rejects her; however, when he and Charlotte kiss and she asks him to leave, Charlotte then discovers BoJack in bed with Penny. Charlotte threatens BoJack to leave and never contact them again and he reluctantly returns to Los Angeles where he discovers the new director finished shooting Secretariat and used a CGI version of BoJack instead. The movie is a critical and commercial hit upon its release.

Seasons 3–5
In season 3, Bojack's role in Secretariat earns him an Oscar nomination, though it is later revealed to be a mistake. Subsequently, he and his roommate, Todd Chavez, have a falling out. BoJack then copes by going on a drug-induced bender with his friend and former co-star in Horsin' Around, Sarah Lynn, which results in her death. Despite being hired again to do a sequel show to Horsin' Around, BoJack runs away fearing he will corrupt his female child co-star like Sarah Lynn and nearly attempts vehicular suicide, but stops upon seeing a group of cross-country running horses.

In season 4, he comes to terms with Sarah Lynn's death after months of avoiding the public eye at his old grandparents' summer house in Michigan and meets with Hollyhock, a young horse who at first believes BoJack to be her biological father, but is later revealed to be his half-sister as a result of an affair between BoJack's father and his maid. He also deals with his mother suffering from dementia. His mother lives with him after getting kicked out of her nursing home for a while until BoJack put her in a nursing home when he discovered she was spiking Hollyhock's drinks with dangerous weight loss pills. BoJack lands the title role on Philbert, an original detective web-series that streams on WhatTimeIsItRightNow.com.

In season 5, while working on Philbert, BoJack begins dating co-star Gina Cazador. During the show's production, he suffers an on-set accident and develops an addiction to prescription painkillers. The first season of Philbert becomes a huge success, and production of season 2 begins almost immediately; during this time, however, BoJack's drug problem worsens until one day on set, while heavily under the influence of painkillers (and likely Philbert-based schizophrenia), he chokes Gina and forgets shortly after. Despite Gina not pressing charges and still working with him, she cuts off personal ties with BoJack before their cover-up interview with Biscuits Braxby. Season 5 ends with Philbert getting cancelled due to Todd's robot CEO facing sexual allegations, and BoJack checking himself into rehab with Diane's transport and urging.

Season 6
In the first half of season 6, he is seen as having been healed significantly as a result of rehab. In the season six episode "The Face of Depression", it is revealed he's been coloring his hair black for the last 20 years; the real color of his hair is grey. At the end of this episode, BoJack accepts a role as a drama teacher at Wesleyan University, where Hollyhock is a student, after Raven-Symoné removes herself from consideration. He enjoys this new job and quieter life, forging a deep connection with his students and discovering a newfound love of teaching, though he struggles to connect with Hollyhock, whom over winter break learned about him intoxicating Maddy and silencing Pete in New Mexico, though she does not directly confront him on this. In the second half of season 6, after a student actor showcase with Diane, Princess Carolyn, and Todd in attendance, BoJack receives a call from Charlotte telling him that reporters have been pestering her in her home for information about his time in New Mexico and orders him to get rid of them; this gives BoJack an anxiety attack and causes him to come to terms with the fact that details of his past are about to come to light. The following week, Paige Sinclair publishes an article with the Hollywoo Reporter providing all the details of Sarah Lynn's death, revealing to the public for the first time BoJack's involvement in it.

BoJack attempts to capitalize on the upcoming interview regarding his role in Sarah Lynn's death. While initially receiving praise for his honesty, he is effectively "canceled" after the second interview uncovers his influential erratic relationships with women in his circle, and his true culpability: by him waiting 17 minutes to call the ambulance, Sarah Lynn actually died at the hospital. BoJack hits rock-bottom, losing his job at Wesleyan, house, and his relationship with Hollyhock, and is blackballed in Hollywood. He forms an unlikely friendship with fellow "canceled" actor Vance Waggoner, who encourages him to channel his anger into work, their first being a bawdy, low-brow comedy film called The Horny Unicorn. BoJack is eventually contacted by Angela Diaz, the network executive who in the '90s intimidated him into keeping quiet about Herb's outing. She tells BoJack that the network is releasing new versions of Horsin' Around with all his scenes cut, and goads him to take up drinking again after signing away his residual credit. BoJack gets drunk with her and learns that Angela manipulated him into allowing Herb's firing. When she rejects his condemnation and retorts they were equally opportunistic, BoJack gives into his despair, breaking into his old home and reverting to his old habits. After attempting to contact Diane (leaving a casually desperate voice mail for her to call him back), BoJack attempts suicide by overdosing on pills and drowning in his old swimming pool, experiencing a near-death experience in which he faces the options of his shattered life through the visions and stories of his deceased family and associates, hosted by Herb himself. He ultimately ends the vision in a conversation with a distal version of Diane over the "Horsin'" set phone as black tar swallows him.

Series finale

Later that night, BoJack's body is found in the pool by the family who now owns the house. While he is initially thought to be dead, that assessment turns out to be false and he wakes up in the hospital some time later handcuffed to his bed. He is sentenced to 14 months in prison for breaking and entering. Roughly a year later, he is released from prison for a weekend (although he does end up going back to prison early) to attend Princess Carolyn's wedding to Judah. Over the course of that day, he shares a reconciling moment with each of his friends before concluding his prison sentence: he shares a drive with Mr. Peanut butter, who tries to return the D to the Hollywood sign (though he accidentally orders a B, renaming it Hollywoob); he reconnects with Todd at the beach, who tells him that he has turned his life around and assures BoJack that he can too; and he shares a dance with Princess Carolyn, thanking her for what she has done for his life and asking for her to represent him should he try to rejoin show business (she says his future prospects look bright but declines, saying she will recommend some excellent managers when he is released from prison, and he looks content to hear that).

Finally, he has a conversation with Diane on the rooftop, who tells him about the voice message he left her before his suicide attempt and tells him that while she is relieved that he is alive, she was angry that she let him have so much power over her. BoJack apologizes for the pain he's caused her, but learns she's become a fairly successful young adult novelist and married Guy. She tells him that she is grateful for knowing him and for her time in LA because they made her who she is, but she deems that time a past version of her, and explains that people can still be grateful for others' influence without them being in their life forever. BoJack hesitantly wonders if this is their last conversation together, to which she thanks him for their experience. He offers a parting sardonic story about his prison's "movie night", and the series ends with BoJack and Diane sharing a quiet moment together under the stars.

Development
Creator Raphael Bob-Waksberg came up with initial kernal of BoJack as the "story of a guy who's had every opportunity imaginable, but still can't find a way to be happy, and what is that about for him?" BoJack's house and the overall emotional plot was inspired from Bob-Waksberg's first house in Los-Angeles, where he felt "on top of the world and also never more isolated or alone." Bob-Waksberg considered other ideas for BoJack's occupation like him being a former racehorse before deciding on him being a former actor. Supervising Director Mike Hollingsworth noted that a former actor can still act in their later life but aging does not allow for athletes to continue successfully in their later life.

Reception 
Actor Will Arnett, who voices BoJack, stated in an interview with Vanity Fair that he was drawn to playing the character due to his deep character flaws, namely his emotional scarring, and that he believes BoJack is both lovable and unlovable at the same time. Arnett has received praise for his portrayal of BoJack and ability to balance comedy with emotion, especially in the fifth season episode "Free Churro", which consists almost entirely of a eulogy that BoJack delivers for his mother at her funeral. Screen Rant ranked the character as the fifth most likeable opining that despite his narcissism he is "smart, cynical, and direct".

See also 

 List of BoJack Horseman characters
 List of fictional horses

References 

 The plot description and characterization were adapted from BoJack Horseman on BoJack Horseman Wiki, which is available under a Creative Commons Attribution-Share Alike 3.0 (Unported) (CC-BY-SA 3.0) license.

External links 
 

Animated characters introduced in 2014
Anthropomorphic mammals
BoJack Horseman characters
Comedy television characters
Fictional actors
Fictional alcohol abusers
Fictional attempted suicides
Fictional characters from Los Angeles
Fictional characters from San Francisco
Fictional characters with major depressive disorder
Fictional comedians
Fictional domestic abusers
Fictional drug addicts
Fictional horses
Fictional professors
Fictional television personalities
Fictional tobacco addicts
Fictional victims of domestic abuse
Male characters in animated series
Narcissism in television
Television characters introduced in 2014